Chun Myung-hoon (born April 6, 1978) is a South Korean singer, rapper, actor and television presenter. He is a member of boy band NRG. He released his single, Welcome To The Jungle on October 19, 2012. He is well known as a cast member on several TV shows, including Girl Spirit.

Career

Early years
Chun's passion for dance began early and he had been part of a break-dancing crew during his teenage years. Despite his father's opposition to him entering show business, Chun began his career as a backup dancer and debuted in 1996 as one-half of the dance-pop duo Hamo Hamo (ko) with Lee Sung-jin, while Noh Yoo-min and Moon Sung-hoon served as their backup dancers. The foursome would go on to form NRG. As they debuted around the same time as H.O.T., Chun quipped on Handsome Boys of the 20th Century that NRG would not have been formed had Hamo Hamo not been overshadowed by the massive success of H.O.T.

1997–2009: NRG, military service and disbandment
In 1997, the four members of Hamo Hamo and new addition Kim Hwan-sung (died in 2000) were formed into a boy band called NRG, which stood for "New Radiancy Group". The group had their big break with the 2003 single "Hit Song", composed by Chun, and won their first ever #1 on a music program. With Moon having left the group in 2004, the group took a break before releasing their seventh album One of Five. They went on hiatus while Chun and Noh served their mandatory military service from 2007 to 2009. However their future plans of a comeback were put on hold due to Lee's fraud and gambling investigation and they eventually agreed to go their separate ways.

2009–2016: Solo activities
After NRG's disbandment, Chun was the only member who remained in the entertainment industry; Noh and Moon had both entered the business world while Lee stayed out of the public eye due to his legal troubles. Chun began his career as a solo singer and a cast member on various variety shows. He was a main cast member on the variety-reality show Handsome Boys of the 20th Century which featured his fellow first-generation counterparts Moon Hee-jun and Tony An of H.O.T., Sechs Kies leader and rapper Eun Ji-won and rapper Danny Ahn of g.o.d, all of whom were born in the year 1978. The five entertainers formed a "group" called HOTSechgodRG, a combination of all their idol group names, and remade NRG's debut song "I Can Do It" (할 수 있어).

2017: NRG's comeback
On October 22, 2016, Chun reunited with Noh Yoo-min and Lee Sung-jin to announce that NRG would be returning the following year to celebrate the 20th anniversary of their debut.

Discography

As a featured artist

Filmography

Variety shows

Music videos

References

External links

1978 births
Living people
South Korean male singers
South Korean male rappers
South Korean male idols
South Korean pop singers
South Korean hip hop dancers
South Korean television presenters
Kyung Hee University alumni
Musicians from Seoul
Yeongyang Cheon clan
Mr Trot participants